Much of Scotland is mountainous; western areas of the Highlands enjoy a wet climate. The more steeply plunging west coast highland rivers in particular are home to countless waterfalls. Scotland has over 150 waterfalls, most are situated in the Highlands due to the landscape

Names of falls
The term ‘linn’ is found throughout southern and eastern Scotland (and in the northern English county of Northumberland). Confusingly 'linn' can denote either a fall or the plunge pool or indeed a confined stretch of water. ‘Spout’ is another common word found throughout England and Scotland for particular types of fall though it is usually replaced by ‘sput’ in the formerly Gaelic-speaking parts of the latter.

The Gaelic word ‘eas’ is by far the most common term for a waterfall in the Scottish Highlands where the majority of place names are of Gaelic origin.

Highest waterfalls in Scotland 

The list of highest waterfalls is sometimes debatable, due to the ambiguity of whether to measure the single largest fall or the sum of a series of falls, and many falls make false claims to the record.
This table measures waterfalls by tallest single drop.

Alphabetical tables of named waterfalls

A

B

C

D

E

F

G

H, I, J

K

L

M, N

O, P, Q, R

S

T

U, V, W, X, Y, Z

References
Ordnance Survey 1:25,000 scale Explorer map series, sheets 309-470

Notes

External links
Map of Waterfalls of Scotland compiled from this list

Waterfalls
Scotland